The 2019 Blackburn with Darwen Borough Council election took place on 2 May 2019 to elect members of Blackburn with Darwen Borough Council in England. This was the same day as other local elections.

Results summary

Council Composition 
Prior to the election, the composition of the council was:

LD - Liberal Democrat

After the election, the composition of the council was:

LD - Liberal Democrat

Ward results 
All results are listed below:

Audley & Queen's Park

Bastwell & Daisyfield

Billinge & Beardwood

Blackburn Central

Blackburn South & Lower Darwen

Blackburn South East

Darwen East 
}}

Darwen South

Darwen West

Ewood

Little Harwood & Whitebirk

Livesey with Pleasington

Mill Hill & Moorgate

Roe Lee

Shear Brow & Corporation Park

Wensley Fold

West Pennine

References 

2019 English local elections
2019
2010s in Lancashire
May 2019 events in the United Kingdom